John Macready (born April 29, 1975) is an American gymnast and motivational speaker. He is the grandson of the actor George Macready.

Macready was a member of the 1996 US Olympic Team and two-time World Championship Team member in 1995 and 1997. He was the youngest member of the 1996 men's US Olympic gymnastics team. He has worked with the Make a Wish Foundation and hosts the annual "John Macready March of Dimes Invitational."

John Macready and John Roethlisberger own and operate FLIPFEST, a gymnastics camp Located on Lake Frances in Crossville, Tennessee.

References

External links
http://www.macready.com/dynamics.htm

Living people
1975 births
Gymnasts at the 1996 Summer Olympics
Olympic gymnasts of the United States
American male artistic gymnasts